Duffin is a surname, and may refer to:

 Adam Duffin (1841–1924), Irish unionist politician
 Graeme Duffin (born 1956), Scottish guitarist
 Jackie Duffin (born 1950), Canadian medical historian and hematologist
 Richard Duffin (1909–1996), American physicist
 Shay Duffin (1931–2010), American actor
 Terry Duffin (born 1982), Zimbabwean cricketer